Abdul Aziz ibn Saud may refer to:

Abdul-Aziz ibn Muhammad ibn Saud (1720–1803), second imam (leader) of the First Saudi State
 Abdulaziz ibn Abdul Rahman Al Saud (1876–1953), known as Ibn Saud of Saudi Arabia, founder and first king of modern-day Saudi Arabia